Grand Prix Rudy Dhaenens was a professional road bicycle race held annually in Nevele (Belgium) to honor the former World Racing Champion Rudy Dhaenens. In 2005 the race was organized as a 1.1 event on the UCI Europe Tour. The race was held as a National Event race in 2006.

Winners 

UCI Europe Tour races
Cycle races in Belgium
Recurring sporting events established in 1999
1999 establishments in Belgium
Sport in East Flanders
Defunct cycling races in Belgium
Recurring sporting events disestablished in 2007
2007 disestablishments in Belgium